Broadway is the codename of the 32-bit central processing unit (CPU) used in Nintendo's Wii home video game console. It was designed by IBM, and was initially produced using a 90 nm SOI process and later produced with a 65 nm SOI process.

According to IBM, the processor consumes 20% less power than its predecessor, the 180 nm Gekko used in the GameCube video game console.

Broadway was produced by IBM at their semiconductor development and manufacturing facility in East Fishkill, New York (now owned by GlobalFoundries). The bond, assembly, and test operation for the Broadway module was performed at the IBM facility in Bromont, Quebec. Very few official details have been released to the public by Nintendo or IBM; unofficial reports claim it is derived from the 486 MHz Gekko architecture used in the GameCube and runs 50% faster at 729 MHz.

The PowerPC 750CL, released in 2006, is a stock CPU offered by IBM; it is virtually identical to Broadway, but was provided in multiple clock speed variants (ranging from 400 MHz–1000 MHz.)

Specifications
 90 nanometer process technology, shrunk to 65 nm in 2007. 
 Superscalar Out-of-order execution PowerPC core, specially modified for the Wii platform
 IBM silicon on insulator (SOI) technology
 Backward compatible with the Gekko processor
 729 MHz
 4 stages long Two integer ALUs (IU1 and IU2) – 32 bit
 7 stages long 64-bit floating-point unit (FPU) (or 2 × 32-bit SIMD, often found under the denomination "paired singles")
 Branch Prediction Unit (BPU)
 Load-Store Unit (LSU)
 System Register Unit (SRU)
 Memory Management Unit (MMU)
 Branch Target Instruction Cache (BTIC)
 SIMD Instructions – PowerPC750 + Roughly 50 new SIMD instructions, geared toward 3D graphics
 64 kB L1 cache (32 kB instruction + 32 kB data)
 256 kB L2 cache
 2.9 GFLOPS

External bus
 64-bit
 243 MHz
 1.944 gigabytes per second bandwidth

Gallery

References 

Nintendo chips
Wii hardware
IBM microprocessors
PowerPC microprocessors